The girls' singles tournament of the 2019 Badminton Asia Junior Championships will be held from 24 to 28 July. Wang Zhiyi from China clinched this title in the last edition.

Seeds
Seeds were announced on 2 July.

 Phittayaporn Chaiwan (second round)
 Zhou Meng (champion)
 Putri Kusuma Wardani (quarterfinals)
 Han Qianxi (final)
 Benyapa Aimsaard (semifinals)
 Lee So-yul (third round)
 Yasnita Enggira Setiawan (second round)
 Stephanie Widjaja (second round)

Draw

Finals

Top half

Section 1

Section 2

Bottom half

Section 3

Section 4

References

External links 
Main Draw

2019 Badminton Asia Junior Championships